Philip K. Dick was an American author known for his science fiction works, often with dystopian and drug related themes.  Some of his works have gone on to be adapted to films and series garnering much acclaim, such as the 1982 Ridley Scott film Blade Runner, which was an adaptation of Dick's 1968 novel Do Androids Dream of Electric Sheep?, released three months posthumously to Dick's passing. The only adaptation released in his lifetime was a 1962 episode of the UK TV series Out of This World, based on Dick's 1953 short story "Impostor". Other works such as the films Total Recall, Minority Report and A Scanner Darkly have also gone on to critical or commercial success, while television adaptations such as The Man in the High Castle has gone on to long-form television adaptation successfully. In 2017, following the success of Netflix's science fiction short story series Black Mirror, and its own success with The Man in the High Castle, streaming service Amazon Prime Video paired up with Channel 4 to produce a series of short stories originally released between 1953 and 1955 under the series title Philip K. Dick's Electric Dreams, the only adaptation bearing the author's own name. The following is a list of film and television adaptations of his writings.

Supporting references and sources

 
Films based on science fiction novels
Lists of television series based on works
Dick
Lists of films based on works